Lakewood Township may refer to:

 Lakewood Township, Shelby County, Illinois
 Lakewood Township, New Jersey
 Lakewood Township, Lake of the Woods County, Minnesota
 Lakewood Township, St. Louis County, Minnesota

Township name disambiguation pages